The Château de Breuschwickersheim is a château in Breuschwickersheim, Bas-Rhin, Alsace, France. It became a monument historique in 1929.

References

Breuschwickersheim
Monuments historiques of Bas-Rhin